Jamal Nazrul Islam (24 February 1939 – 16 March 2013) was a Bangladeshi mathematical physicist and cosmologist. He was a professor at University of Chittagong, served as a member of the advisory board at Shahjalal University of Science and Technology and member of the syndicate at Chittagong University of Engineering & Technology until his death. He also served as the director of the Research Center for Mathematical and Physical Sciences (RCMPS) at the University of Chittagong. He was awarded Ekushey Padak in 2000 by the Government of Bangladesh.

Early life and education
Jamal Nazrul Islam was born on 24 February 1939 in Jhenaidah. His ancestral home is at Jujkhola Narayanhat of Fatikchhari Upazila of Chittagong District, East Bengal. His father, Khan Bahadur Sirajul Islam, was a sub-judge in British India. Because of his father's job, Islam spent his early school years in Calcutta. He studied at Chittagong Collegiate School and College until ninth grade and then he went to Lawrence College, Murree in West Pakistan to pass the Senior Cambridge and Higher Senior Cambridge exams. He received a BSc degree from St. Xavier's College at the University of Calcutta. In 1959, he got his Honors in Functional Mathematics and Theoretical Physics from Cambridge University. He completed his master's degree in 1960. As a student of the Trinity College, he finished the Mathematical Tripos. Islam obtained his PhD in applied mathematics and theoretical physics from Trinity College, Cambridge in 1968, followed by a DSc in 1982.

Academic career
Islam worked in the Institute of Theoretical Astronomy (later amalgamated to Institute of Astronomy, Cambridge) from 1967 until 1971. Later he worked as a researcher in California Institute of Technology and University of Washington. During 1973–1974, he served as the faculty of Applied Mathematics of King's College London. In 1978, he then joined the faculty of City University London until he returned to Chittagong in 1984. In 2006, he was made Professor Emeritus at the University of Chittagong.

His research areas included applied mathematics, theoretical physics, mathematical physics, the theories of gravitation, general relativity, mathematical cosmology, and quantum field theory. Islam authored, coauthored or edited more than 50 scientific articles, books and some popular articles published in various scientific journals. Besides this he has also written books in Bengali. Particularly noteworthy are Black Hole, published by the Bangla Academy, "The Mother Tongue, Scientific Research and other Articles" and "Art, Literature and Society". The latter two are compilations.

In 1997, Islam was invited to the International Symposium on Mathematical Physics in memory of Subrahmanyan Chandrasekhar with a special session on Abdus Salam arranged by Calcutta Mathematical Society in Kolkata-India. Professor Narayan Chandra Ghosh, a mathematician of India, was director of the noted symposium.

Fellowships
 Third World Academy of Science (1985)
 Cambridge Philosophical Society
 Royal Astronomical Society
 Bangladesh Academy of Sciences (1983)
 Islamic Academy of Sciences

Death
Islam died on 16 March 2013 in Chittagong.

Awards
 Gold award from Bangladesh Academy of Sciences (Senior group; 1985)
 Medal Lecture award from Accademia Nazionale delle Scienze (1998)
 Bangladesh National Award for Science and Technology (1998)
 Ekushey Padak (2000)
 Razzak-Shamsun Lifetime Achievement Award in Physics from the University of Dhaka (2011)

Books authored/coauthored/edited
 Islam, J.N. (1983): The Ultimate Fate of the Universe. Cambridge University Press, Cambridge, England. . (Digital print version published in 2009).
 Bonnor, W.B., Islam, J.N., MacCallum, M.A.H. (eds.)(1983): Classical General Relativity: Proceedings of the Conference on Classical (Non-Quantum) General Relativity, Cambridge University Press, Cambridge, England. .
 Islam, J.N. (1985): Rotating Fields in General Relativity, Cambridge University Press, Cambridge, England. . (Digital print version published in 2009).
 Islam, J.N. (1992, 2nd edition 2002): An Introduction to Mathematical Cosmology, Cambridge University Press, Cambridge, England. .

References

External links

 SAO/NASA Astrophysics Data System (ADS)
 TWAS membership
 Islamic World Academy of Sciences
 Jamal Nazrul Islam (1939–2013)
 My memories of Jamal Nazrul Islam
 Famous South Asian physicist, cosmologist J N Islam died
 Professor Jamal Nazrul Islam — as I saw him
 Jamal Nazrul Islam: The passionate learner
 Life sketch of Prof Jamal Nazrul Islam 

1939 births
2013 deaths
People from Jhenaidah District
Bangladeshi physicists
Bengali physicists
Bengali mathematicians
University of Calcutta alumni
Fellows of Bangladesh Academy of Sciences
Alumni of Trinity College, Cambridge
Recipients of the Ekushey Padak
Academic staff of Shahjalal University of Science and Technology
Academic staff of the University of Chittagong
Honorary Fellows of Bangla Academy
Fellows of the Islamic World Academy of Sciences